The Mount Hood National Forest is a U.S. National Forest in the U.S. state of Oregon, located  east of the city of Portland and the northern Willamette River valley. The Forest includes and is named after Mount Hood, a stratovolcano and the highest mountain in the state.

Forest headquarters are located in Sandy, Oregon. The Forest is divided into four separate districts – Barlow (with offices in Dufur), Clackamas River (Estacada), Hood River (Mount Hood-Parkdale), and Zigzag (Zigzag).

In descending order of land area, Mount Hood National Forest is located in parts of Clackamas, Hood River, Wasco, Multnomah, Marion, and Jefferson counties.

History
Mount Hood National Forest was first established as the Bull Run Forest Reserve in 1892. It was expanded in 1893. It extended from the Columbia River to the South Fork of the Santiam River until 1911 when the Santiam National Forest was proclaimed and the southern border of the Oregon National Forest was moved north to the divide between the Santiam River and Clackamas River. The name was changed again to Mount Hood National Forest in 1924.

In 1940 it was under consideration to become Mount Hood National Park, but this proposal did not materialize. A modern campaign opposed to logging in the national forest revived the push for national park status along with the Columbia River Gorge.

The 1952 film Bend of the River was partly shot in Mount Hood National Forest.

In 2010, Mount Hood National Forest was honored with its own quarter under the America the Beautiful Quarters program.

Recreation

The Mount Hood National Forest is one of the most-visited National Forests in the United States, with over four million visitors annually.  Less than five percent of the visitors camp in the forest.  The forest contains 170 developed recreation sites, including:
 Timberline Lodge, built in 1937 high on Mount Hood
 Lost Lake
 Burnt Lake
 Trillium Lake
 Timothy Lake
 Rock Creek Reservoir
 The Old Oregon Trail, including Barlow Road

Other common recreational activities in the Mount Hood National Forest include fishing, boating, hiking, hunting, rafting, horseback riding, skiing, mountain biking, berry-picking, and mushroom collecting.  A portion of the Pacific Crest Trail passes through the National Forest on the flanks of the mountain.  Mount Hood is a popular destination for mountain climbers.

Several nonprofits lead free hikes into the National Forest to build support for further protection from logging and off-road vehicle use, including BARK and Oregon Wild.

Mount Hood National Recreation Area was established within Mount Hood National Forest on March 30, 2009.  The recreation area comprises three separate units.

Wilderness

There are eight officially designated wilderness areas within Mount Hood National Forest collectively adding up to 311,448 acres that are part of the National Wilderness Preservation System. Acreages are as of 2011.
 Badger Creek Wilderness at 
 Bull of the Woods Wilderness at 
 Clackamas Wilderness at 
 Lower White River Wilderness at  not counting  on BLM land
 Mark O. Hatfield Wilderness at 
 Mount Hood Wilderness at  includes the peak and upper slopes of Mount Hood
 Roaring River Wilderness at 
 Salmon–Huckleberry Wilderness at 

The Olallie Scenic Area is a lightly roaded lake basin that also offers a primitive recreational experience.

References

External links 

 Mount Hood National Forest - US Forest Service
 Mount Hood National Forest - Wildernet.com
 Hiking Mount Hood National Forest - GORP
 Mount Hood National Park Campaign - MHNPC

 
National Forests of Oregon
Columbia River Gorge
Mount Hood
Protected areas of Clackamas County, Oregon
Protected areas of Hood River County, Oregon
Protected areas of Wasco County, Oregon
Protected areas of Multnomah County, Oregon
Protected areas of Marion County, Oregon
Protected areas of Jefferson County, Oregon
1908 establishments in Oregon